The 1982 Southern Illinois Salukis football team was an American football team that represented Southern Illinois University in the Missouri Valley Conference (MVC) during the 1982 NCAA Division I-AA football season.  Under seventh-year head coach Rey Dempsey, the team compiled a 6–5 record. The team played its home games at McAndrew Stadium in Carbondale, Illinois.

Schedule

References

Southern Illinois
Southern Illinois Salukis football seasons
Southern Illinois Salukis football